Dash & Lily is an American romantic comedy television series created by Joe Tracz and based on the young adult novel series Dash & Lily's Book of Dares by Rachel Cohn and David Levithan. The 8-episode series premiered on Netflix on November 10, 2020. In October 2021, the series was canceled after one season.

Premise
During the Christmas holiday season, two teenagers living in New York City develop mutual romantic feelings as they open up to each other by trading messages as well as dares in a notebook around a multitude of locations. Along the way, they deal with how their blossoming romance affects and is impacted by friends, family members, and previous love interests.

Cast

Main

 Austin Abrams as Dash, a teenager who hates Christmas
 Midori Francis as Lily, a 17-year-old girl who wants to find love
 Dante Brown as Boomer, Dash's best friend
 Troy Iwata as Langston, Lily's older brother

Recurring

 Keana Marie as Sofia, Dash's ex-girlfriend
 Michael Cyril Creighton as Jeff the Elf/Door Queen, a local actor
 Patrick Vaill as Mark, a clerk at the Strand Bookstore
 William Hill as Sal/Santa Claus, Lily and Langston's paternal uncle
 Leah Kreitz as Aryn, a member of Lily's caroling group
 Ianne Fields Stewart as Roberta, a member of Lily's caroling group
 Agneeta Thacker as Priya, Sofia's best friend
 James Saito as Arthur Mori, Lily and Langston's Japanese American maternal grandfather
 Gideon Emery as Adam, Lily and Langston's father
 Jennifer Ikeda as Grace, Lily and Langston's mother
 Diego Guevara as Benny, Langston's boyfriend
 Glenn McCuen as Edgar Thibaud, Lily's bully from middle school
 Jodi Long as Lillian/"Mrs. Basil E.", Lily and Langston's maternal great-aunt, and Arthur's sister
 Michael Park as Gordon, Dash's father

Guests
 Nick Blaemire as Dov, a Jewish American teenager and one of the "Challah Back Boys"
 Trevor Braun as Yohnny, a Jewish American teenager and one of the "Challah Back Boys"
 Nick Jonas as Himself
 Jonas Brothers as Themselves (Performing "Like It's Christmas")

Episodes

Production

Development
Netflix ordered an 8-episode adaptation of Levithan and Cohn's novel in October 2019. Joe Tracz served as series showrunner as well as writer and executive producer. Shawn Levy and Josh Barry from 21 Laps Entertainment, Nick Jonas from Image 32, and Brad Silberling also executive produced with Cohn and Levithan co-executive producing. Directors included Silberling, Fred Savage, and Pamela Romanowsky. On October 6, 2021, Netflix canceled the series after one season.

Casting
It was announced along with the series order that Austin Abrams and Midori Francis would star as the titular characters. Dante Brown and Troy Iwata would feature in the main cast and Keana Marie, James Saito, and Jodi Long in the recurring cast. The second round of casting was announced in November 2019 with Glenn McCuen, Michael Park, Gideon Emery, Jennifer Ikeda, and Diego Guevara also in the recurring cast. It was announced in March 2020 that Agneeta Thacker, Leah Kreitz, and Ianne Fields Stewart had joined the cast.

Release
The series was released on November 10, 2020.

Reception

Critical response
For the series, review aggregator Rotten Tomatoes reported an approval rating of 100% based on 34 reviews, with an average rating of 7.64/10. The website's critics consensus reads, "Anchored by the charming Midori Francis and Austin Abrams, Dash & Lily is a delightful rom-com adventure with plenty of holiday cheer." Metacritic gave the series a weighted average score of 80 out of 100 based on 4 reviews, indicating "generally favorable reviews".

Awards and nominations

See also
 List of Christmas films

References

External links
 
 

2020 American television series debuts
2020 American television series endings
2020s American LGBT-related comedy television series
2020s American romantic comedy television series
Christmas television series
English-language Netflix original programming
Television series about teenagers
Television series based on American novels
Television shows set in New York City